The 1902 Washington Senators won 61 games, lost 75, and finished in sixth place in the American League. They were managed by Tom Loftus and played home games at the  American League Park I.

Offseason 
 October 19, 1901: Ed Delahanty jumped to the Senators from the Philadelphia Phillies.

Regular season

Season standings

Record vs. opponents

Roster

Player stats

Batting

Starters by position 
Note: Pos = Position; G = Games played; AB = At bats; H = Hits; Avg. = Batting average; HR = Home runs; RBI = Runs batted in

Other batters 
Note: G = Games played; AB = At bats; H = Hits; Avg. = Batting average; HR = Home runs; RBI = Runs batted in

Pitching

Starting pitchers 
Note: G = Games played; GS = Games started; IP = Innings pitched; W = Wins; L = Losses; ERA = Earned run average; SO = Strikeouts

Notes

References 
1902 Washington Senators at Baseball-Reference
1902 Washington Senators team page at www.baseball-almanac.com

Minnesota Twins seasons
Washington Senators season
Washington